Crosby may refer to:

Places
Canada
Crosby, Ontario, part of the township of Rideau Lakes, Ontario
Crosby, Ontario, a neighbourhood in the city of Markham, Ontario

England
Crosby, Cumbria
Crosby, Lincolnshire
Crosby, Merseyside
Crosby (UK Parliament constituency)
Crosby, North Yorkshire
Crosby Beach, Merseyside
Great Crosby, Merseyside
Little Crosby, Merseyside
Crosby-on-Eden, Cumbria

Isle of Man
Crosby, Isle of Man

United States
Crosby, Alabama
Crosby, Minnesota
Crosby, Mississippi
Crosby, North Dakota
Crosby Township, Hamilton County, Ohio
Crosby, Pennsylvania
Crosby, Texas
Crosby County, Texas
Crosby, Washington

South Africa
Crosby, Gauteng

Other uses
Crosby (surname)
USS Crosby (DD-164), a Wickes class destroyer
Crosby, a fictional location in The Railway Series

See also
 Crosbie (disambiguation)